Nele D'Haene (born 13 February 1960) is a former Belgian racing cyclist. She won the Belgian national road race title in 1980 and 1984.

References

External links

1960 births
Living people
Belgian female cyclists
People from Wevelgem
Cyclists from West Flanders